Methylcytosine may refer to:

 5-Methylcytosine
 1-Methylcytosine, a nucleic acid in Hachimoji DNA
 N(4)-Methylcytosine
 6-Methylcytosine

See also
 Cytosine
 Nucleic acid analogue